Ineson is an English surname. Notable people with the surname include:

Chris Ineson (born 1945), New Zealand field hockey player
Emma Ineson (born 1969), British Anglican priest and academic
Phil Ineson, British academic
Ralph Ineson (born 1969), English actor
Tony Ineson (born 1950), New Zealand field hockey player

See also
Ineson Glacier, a glacier of James Ross Island, Antarctica

English-language surnames